Franklin Lofts, originally known as the Lomas & Nettleton Building, is an 8-story,  building in downtown Houston, Texas. The building is generally regarded as the first skyscraper in the city. The Lomas & Nettleton Building was completed in 1904, and rises 8 floors in height. A new addition was completed in 1925. It was also the tallest steel-framed building west of the Mississippi River at the time of its completion.

The Lomas & Nettleton Company was originally housed in the building, but it was converted to residential lofts and renamed in 1999.

Zoned schools
Franklin Lofts is within the Houston Independent School District. As of 2015 the building is assigned to Gregory Lincoln Education Center (Grades K-8), and Northside High School (formerly Jefferson Davis High).

Residents were previously zoned to Bruce Elementary School, and E. O. Smith Education Center (for middle school).

See also

 List of tallest buildings in Houston

References

External links
 Franklin Lofts

Buildings and structures in Houston
Sanguinet & Staats buildings
Downtown Houston